Murexide (NH4C8H4N5O6, or C8H5N5O6·NH3), also called ammonium purpurate or MX, is the ammonium salt of purpuric acid. It is a purple solid that is soluble in water.  The compound was once used as an indicator reagent. Aqueous solutions are yellow at low pH, reddish-purple in weakly acidic solutions, and blue-purple in alkaline solutions.

Preparation
Murexide is prepared by treating alloxantin with ammonia to 100 °C, or by treating uramil (5-aminobarbituric acid) with mercury oxide. It may also be prepared by digesting alloxan with alcoholic ammonia.

History
Justus von Liebig and Friedrich Wöhler in Giessen, Germany, had investigated the purple product, murexide, obtained from snake excrement in the 1830s, but this was not an abundant raw material, and a method of using it as a dyestuff was not established at that time. In the 1850s, French colourists and dye-producers, such as Depoully in Paris, succeeded in making murexide from abundant South American guano and of applying it to natural fibres. It was then widely adopted in Britain, France and Germany.

Use

Murexide is used in analytical chemistry as a complexometric indicator for complexometric titrations, most often of calcium ions, but also for copper, nickel, cobalt, thorium and rare-earth metals. It functions as a tridentate ligand.

Its use has been eclipsed by calcium-ion selective electrodes.

References

Ammonium compounds
Complexometric indicators
Dyes
Pyrimidines
Lactams
Enones